Wallace Farm may refer to:

Wallace-Alford Farmstead, Midway, Kentucky, listed on the National Register of Historic Places in Woodford County, Kentucky
Wallace Farm (Columbia, New Hampshire), listed on the National Register of Historic Places in New Hampshire
Wallace Farm (Cuyahoga Valley National Park), listed on the National Register of Historic Places in Summit County, Ohio